Way Out West is an album by bassist Richard Davis recorded in 1977 but not released on the Muse label until 1980.

Reception
Allmusic awarded the album 3 stars stating "Ranging from straightahead to some funky pop, this is an interesting if not essential release from the masterful bassist".

Track listing 
 "A Peace for Richard" (S. Roune) – 2:00   
 "Elephant Boy" (Bill Lee) – 6:18   
 "Do a Dog a Favor" (Robert Bowers, Pat Davis) – 3:15   
 "On the Trail" (Ferde Grofé) – 7:29   
 "I'm Old Fashioned" (Jerome Kern, Johnny Mercer) – 4:24   
 "Sienna: Waiting for the Moment" (Stanley Cowell) – 5:05   
 "Warm Canto" (Mal Waldron) – 4:11   
 "Song of Gratitude" (Consuela Lee Moorehead) – 3:13   
 "Don't You Worry 'bout a Thing" (Stevie Wonder) – 3:00

Personnel 
Richard Davis – bass
Eddie Henderson – trumpet (tracks 2, 3 & 6–9) 
Joe Henderson – tenor saxophone (tracks 2–4, 6, 8 & 9)
Stanley Cowell – piano (tracks 2, 3 & 5–9)
Billy Cobham – synthesizer, drums (tracks 2, 3, 5, 6 8 & 9)
Dolly Hirota – vocals (tracks 3, 6 & 7)

References 

Richard Davis (bassist) albums
1980 albums
Muse Records albums